Hossein Ashena (born 8 August 1980) is an Iranian footballer. He currently plays for Sanat Naft in Azadegan League on loan from Paykan.

Club career
Ashena joined Foolad in 2009 after spending the previous season at Rah Ahan.

Club career statistics
Last Update  10 May 2013

References

1980 births
Living people
Foolad FC players
Rah Ahan players
Fajr Sepasi players
Naft Tehran F.C. players
Paykan F.C. players
Saipa F.C. players
Persian Gulf Pro League players
Iranian footballers
Association football goalkeepers